The following lists events that happened during 1977 in South Africa.

Incumbents
 State President: Nico Diederichs.
 Prime Minister: John Vorster.
 Chief Justice: Frans Lourens Herman Rumpff.

Events

January
 8 – The railway line near Soweto is maliciously damaged.

February
 1 – KwaZulu is granted self-governance.
 24 – A bomb explodes at the Daveyton Police Station, causing only superficial damage.

March
 5 – British Formula One driver Tom Pryce dies during the South African Grand Prix at Kyalami when his car strikes and kills marshal Frederik Jansen van Vuuren.
 7 – A Pretoria restaurant is destroyed by a bomb.

April
 1 – Pik Botha, South Africa's ambassador in the United States of America, is appointed as Minister of Foreign Affairs.

June
 4 – Father Smangaliso Mkhatshwa is served a 5-year restriction order.
 15 – Monty Motlaung and Solomon Mahlangu, two Umkhonto we Sizwe cadres, kill two civilians and are arrested.
 29 – The United Party is renamed the New Republic Party.

July
 15 – The railway line at Umlazi in Durban is maliciously damaged.
 29 – The Antipolis, a Greek oil tanker, runs aground on the rocks near Victoria Road in Oudekraal, Cape Town.

August
 A Soviet surveillance satellite detects South Africa's nuclear test preparations and alerts the United States.
 Black Consciousness leader Steve Biko is detained for breaking a banning order.

September
 23 – The Netherlands suspends its cultural agreement with South Africa.

November
 4 – United Nations Security Council Resolution 418 places a mandatory arms embargo against South Africa.
 25 – Fourteen people are injured when a bomb explodes at the Carlton Centre.
 30 – A bomb explodes on a Pretoria-bound train.
 30 – A whites only general election is held. The National Party wins.
 The railway at Dunswart (Boksburg) and Apex (Benoni) is maliciously damaged and a train driver is slightly injured.

December
 12 – Guerrillas attack the Germiston police station.
 14 – A bomb explodes at the Benoni railway station.
 16 – The Venpet-Venoil collision between two supertankers occurs off the coast of Cape St. Francis.
 22 – An unexploded bomb is found in OK Bazaars in Roodepoort.

Unknown date
 Former members of the United Party join the Progressive Reform Party, which is renamed the Progressive Federal Party.
 Cedric Mayson, a Methodist minister, is banned for 5 years.

Births
 20 January – Paul Adams (cricketer), cricketer
 21 January – Bradley Carnell, football player
 30 January – Khumbudzo Ntshavheni, national minister
 31 January – David Terbrugge, cricketer
 14 February – Elmer Symons, motorcycle enduro racer (d. 2007)
 6 March – Khoto Sesinyi, Mosotho footballer
 14 March – Matthew Booth (soccer), soccer player
 24 April – Zola (musician), musician, poet, actor and presenter.
 11 May – Victor Matfield, Springbok rugby player
 21 May – Quinton Fortune, soccer player & coach
 13 June – Stanton Fredericks, soccer player
 18 June – Riaad Moosa, comedian, actor and doctor
 6 July – Makhaya Ntini, cricketer
 12 August – Zanne Stapelberg, soprano singer
 26 August – Gareth Cliff, radio host, television personality and businessman
 2 October – Justin Kemp, cricketer
 21 October – Brett Goldin, actor (d. 2006)
 12 November – Benni McCarthy, soccer striker & coach
 12 November – Susan Wessels-Webber, hockey player
 17 November – Ryk Neethling, swimmer
 25 November – MacBeth Sibaya, soccer player
 2 December – Siyabonga Nomvethe, soccer player
 7 December – Delron Buckley, footballer

Deaths
 29 January – Buster Nupen 75, cricketer. (b. 1902)
 20 February – Christoffel Venter 84, South African Air Force general. (b. 1892)
 5 March – Tom Pryce 27, a Welsh racing driver, (b. 1949) killed during the 1977 South African Grand Prix in Midrand
 8 March – Moses Kottler, sculptor. (b. 1896)
 12 September – Steve Biko 30, black consciousness activist. (b. 1946)

Railways

Locomotives
 The South African Railways places the first of 150 Class 6E1, Series 7 electric locomotives in mainline service.

Sports

Motorsport
 5 March – The South African Grand Prix takes place at Kyalami.

References

South Africa
Years in South Africa
History of South Africa